There have been numerous Monopoly video games based on the core game mechanics of Parker Brothers and Hasbro's board game Monopoly. They have been developed by numerous teams and released on multiple platforms over 35+ years.

List
 Monopoly (1985) by Leisure Genius, multi-platform
 Monopoly (1988) by Nexa Corporation for Sega Master System
 Monopoly (1991) by Sculptured Software for Game Boy, SNES, Genesis, and NES
 Monopoly Deluxe (1992) by Virgin Games for DOS and Windows
 Monopoly (1993) for Super Famicom in Japan by Ape and Creamsoft
 MacPlay Monopoly (1993) by HumanWave Technology for Macintosh
 Monopoly (1995) by Westwood Studios for Macintosh and Windows
 The Monopoly Game 2 (1995, Japan) by Tomcat System for Super Famicom
 Monopoly (1997) by Gremlin Interactive for PlayStation
 Monopoly Star Wars (1997) by Artech Digital Entertainment for Windows
 Monopoly World Cup France 98 Edition (1998) by Hasbro Interactive for Windows
 Monopoly (1999) by Mind's Eye Productions for Nintendo 64
 Monopoly (2000) by Artech Studios for Macintosh, Windows and PlayStation Portable
 Monopoly Tycoon (2001) by Deep Red Games for Windows and mobiles
 EX Monopoly (2001) by Mobile 21 for Game Boy Advance
 Monopoly Party (2002) by Runecraft for PlayStation 2, Xbox, and GameCube
 Monopoly SpongeBob SquarePants Edition (2007) by Navarre Corporation for Windows
 Monopoly (2008) by Encore, Inc. for Windows
 Monopoly Here and Now (2009) by EA Mobile for iOS
 Monopoly: Build-a-lot Edition (2009) by HipSoft for PC
 Monopoly Streets (2010) by EA Salt Lake for PlayStation 3, Xbox 360 and Wii
 Monopoly (2010) for Nintendo DS
 Monopoly (2012) by PopCap Games for Windows and Macintosh
 Monopoly Deal (2014) by Asobo Studio for PlayStation 4, and Xbox One.
 Monopoly Plus (2014) by Asobo Studio for PlayStation 3, PlayStation 4, Windows, Xbox 360, and Xbox One
Monopoly for Nintendo Switch (2017) ported by Engine Software
 Monopoly (2020) for Stadia ported by Engine Software
 Monopoly (2019) for iOS and Android devices, by Marmalade Game Studio
 Monopoly Poker (2020) by Azerion for iOS, Android and PC
 Monopoly Madness (2021) for Google Stadia, Luna, Nintendo Switch, PC, PlayStation 4, PlayStation 5, Xbox One and Xbox Series X/S ported by Engine Software

History

Early versions
Many unlicensed, non-commercial computer games based on Monopoly were distributed on bulletin board systems, public domain software disks and academic computer systems, and appeared as early as the late 1970s. At the time, Parker Brothers was unaware of this distribution until a user informed them of one version that stated "A Parker Brother game" on the title screen; the company then began enforcing its copyright and trademark on Monopoly.

Over the years, Monopoly has been released for different operating systems on the PC and Macintosh platforms. The first of the legally licensed commercial adaptations began in 1985 for the BBC Micro, Amstrad CPC, ZX Spectrum and MSX. Versions have been licensed and produced for the Nintendo Entertainment System, Super NES, Game Boy, Game Boy Advance, Nintendo 64, GameCube, PlayStation, PlayStation 2, Master System, Genesis, Xbox, Xbox 360, PlayStation 3, PlayStation Portable, Wii, and Nintendo Switch consoles, as well as mobile device (PDA/Smartphone) versions.

The Monopoly video games play by the same rules as the standard board game, allowing for single or multiplayer games. When a single player game is chosen, the game in question would generate computer-controlled opponents.

Console and computer versions
Monopoly for the PlayStation was developed by Gremlin Interactive, and a Windows and Macintosh version by Westwood Studios. The Windows/Mac version played top down, while the PlayStation version was in 3D. They both had cutscenes in common, played when showing the game pieces moving on their own. In 1998, Hasbro Interactive released a Monopoly video game for Microsoft Windows, which used 3D graphics instead of the top-down design used in previous versions. It ran on Windows 95 (although can be run on up to Windows XP, but will not work on Windows Vista and up) and had a special online play feature which used a modem.

A new version developed by Electronic Arts was released in 2008 for the Wii, PlayStation 3, iPhone and Xbox 360, with a slightly stripped-down version for the PlayStation 2. It includes a transatlantic selection of boards, including the new Here & Now edition boards and new game mode, Richest. There are no online features, however. EA's Monopoly game scored fairly poorly, with a 54% average on the PS3 on Metacritic, and 56% on the Xbox 360.  The Wii version fared better with 70%. The Official Nintendo Magazine in the UK were most positive in their evaluation of the Wii version, which they called "great fun" in the Christmas 2008 issue. Eurogamer was less enthusiastic, saying: "For the price of Monopoly for Wii, you could buy real Monopoly. Twice. Or you could just buy no Monopoly at all and spend the money on something more likely to inspire amity and harmony, like a book by Hitler."

The Monopoly Family Fun Pack, produced by Ubisoft for PlayStation 4 and Xbox One, was released on November 18, 2014. It is an on-disc bundle consisting of the digitally-released Monopoly Plus and Monopoly Deal, as well as Monopoly Plus's My Monopoly expansion. In 2017, Ubisoft released a more traditional Monopoly video game on the Nintendo Switch, based on Monopoly Plus. This game takes advantage of the Joy-Con's "HD Rumble" feature. In 2020, the Stadia version of the game, based on Monopoly Plus, was released.

Other versions
An official version, Safe As Houses was released for the Atari ST.

An electronic handheld version of the game was marketed from 1997–2001.

For several months in 2009, Google Maps hosted an online version of Monopoly, Monopoly City Streets, using its maps as the board.

References

External links
 

 
Monopoly (game)
Amstrad CPC games
BBC Micro and Acorn Electron games
BlackBerry games
Commodore 64 games
Game Boy games
Game Boy Advance games
Electronic Arts franchises
Ubisoft franchises
IOS games
Nintendo 64 games
Nintendo Entertainment System games
Master System games
Sega Genesis games
Super Nintendo Entertainment System games
PlayStation (console) games
PlayStation 2 games
PlayStation 3 games
PlayStation Network games
PlayStation Portable games
Tomy games
Xbox 360 games
Wii games
Windows games
Video games with isometric graphics
Video games based on Hasbro toys
ZX Spectrum games
Windows Phone games
Video game franchises introduced in 1985
Video games based on board games